George Brown (1650–1730) was a Scottish arithmetician, and inventor of two incomplete mechanical calculating machines now kept at the National Museum of Scotland. In 1698 he was granted a patent for his mechanical calculating device.

He was minister of Stranraer, schoolmaster in Fordyce, Banffshire, and in 1680 schoolmaster at Kilmaurs, Ayrshire. He invented a method of teaching the simple rules of arithmetic, which he explained in his Rotula Arithmetica, 1700. He wrote other arithmetical works; the last of them, Arithmetica Infinita, was endorsed by John Keill.

References
Robert Watt, Bibliographia Britannica
John Sinclair, New Statistical Account of Scotland, 1845
Hew Scott, Fasti Ecclesiae Scoticanae, 1868
Attribution:

External links
An Account of the Rotula Arithmetica, Invented by Mr George Brown, Minister of Kilmaures, Edinburgh, M DC XC VIII

1650 births
1730 deaths
Scottish inventors
Scottish mathematicians